Minmose was the High Priest of Anhur during the reign of Ramesses II

Family
Minmose was the son of the high Priest of Anhur Hori and his wife Inty. Minmose was well connected. He was the brother-in-law to the Northern Vizier Prehotep I.
Minmose was married to Buia called Khat-Nisu. Their daughter Huneroy was married to the Vizier Prehotep II.

Career
Minmose succeeded his father Hori as the Chamberlain of Shu and Tefnut, and High Priest of Anhur. The center of worship was at Thinis. The position of High Priest had been held by Nebwenenef. When Nebwenenef was appointed High Priest of Amun, the priesthood of Anhur was given to Minmose's father Hori.

Monuments
 Granite statue with sistrum (Cairo CGC 1203) The text identifies Minmose as the High Priest of Anhur and the son of Hori and Inty,
 Statuette, Brighton Art Gallery and Museum 
 Black granite table of offerings from Mesheikh (Cairo CGC 23095) The inscriptions mention Minmose's wife and parents.
 Tomb chapel at Abydos
 Shabti figures of Minmose from Abydos The texts mention Minmose's wife Khat-Nisu and an (unnamed) son who serves as Second Priest of Anhur.
 Basalt statuette from Abydos (two fragments) Inscribed for the High Priest of Anhur Minmose.
 Votive pot for the Vizier Prehotep'
 Pot fragments from offerings in the "Tomb of Osiris" Minmose is referred to as High Priest of Anhur and as Prophet of Maat. The text mentions his father Hori.
 Granite block statue from Mesheikh (Cairo CGC 548) Minmose has the title Fanbearer. The front of the statue shows a lioness-headed goddess.

References

People of the Nineteenth Dynasty of Egypt
13th-century BC people
Ramesses II
Ancient Egyptian priests